C. Edwin Baker (May 28, 1947 – December 8, 2009), the Nicholas F. Gallicchio Professor of Law and Communication at the University of Pennsylvania Law School, was a leading scholar of constitutional law, communications law, and free speech.

Biography
Baker was considered one of the country's foremost authorities on the First Amendment and on mass media policy. His most recent scholarship focused on the economics of the news business, political philosophy, and jurisprudential questions concerning the egalitarian and libertarian bases of constitutional theory.

Baker was a native of Madisonville, Kentucky. He received his bachelor's degree from Stanford University and his J.D. degree from Yale Law School. He was a law and humanities fellow at Harvard University in 1974, a fellow at Harvard's Shorenstein Barone Center in 1992, and a Radcliffe fellow there in 2006.

Baker served as a staff attorney for the American Civil Liberties Union and was a professor at the University of Oregon and an assistant professor at the University of Toledo.  He joined the University of Pennsylvania Law School in 1981, and since 2007 held a joint appointment at the Annenberg School for Communication  at Penn.  He was also a visiting professor at New York University, the University of Chicago, Cornell University, Harvard University, and the University of Texas.

Baker died on December 8, 2009, after he collapsed while exercising. Baker was survived by his sister, Nancy L. Baker, Ph.D., a member of the faculty at Fielding Graduate University.  He was predeceased by his parents, Falcon O. Baker, Jr. and Ernestine Magagna Baker.

Books
 Human Liberty and Freedom of Speech (Oxford, 1989) defends interpreting First Amendment freedom of speech as concerned primarily with individual freedom and autonomy rather than the more traditional understanding of it being about a marketplace of ideas
 Advertising and a Democratic Press (Princeton, 1994)
 Media, Markets, and Democracy (Cambridge, 2002), 2002 winner of the Donald McGannon Award for Social and Ethical Relevance in Communications Policy Research. This book has been translated into Chinese and a number of other languages.
 Media Concentration and Democracy: Why Ownership Matters (Cambridge, 2007)

References

External links
 CV at Penn Law
 Blog: an appreciation of C. Edwin Baker, 1947-2009
 SSRN page
 Penn Law Obituary
 Papers to be held at West Virginia University College of Law Library
Baker Links:
 WVU COL Baker Lecture Page
 Radcliffe Institute For Advanced Study Harvard University
 The Faculty Lounge 
 Friends of Ed Baker, Facebook  
 The C. Edwin Baker Media Policy Fellowship  
 National Center for Lesbian Rights C. Edwin Baker Clerkship  
 National Center for Lesbian Rights article  in the newsletter, The Docket:  Law Scholar C. Edwin Baker's Estate Donates $150,000 Gift to NCLR  
 The Daily Pennsylvanian obituary  
 International Communication Association:   C. Edwin Baker Award for the Advancement of Scholarship on Media, Markets and Democracy
 Free Press Announcement
 Future of Music Collation:  FMC Honors C. Edwin Baker
 Testimony of C. Edwin Baker before the Subcommittee on Courts and Competition Policy, Committee on the Judiciary.  House of Representatives, Congress of the United States Hearing on: A New Age in For Newspapers, Diversity of Voices, Competition and the Internet
 
 Angelo State University Symposium:  Market Threats to Press Freedom by C. Edwin Baker

Harvard Fellows
1947 births
2009 deaths
First Amendment scholars
American scholars of constitutional law
Radcliffe fellows
Stanford University alumni
University of Pennsylvania Law School faculty
Yale Law School alumni